The Augraben is a river of Mecklenburg-Vorpommern, Germany. It is a tributary of the Tollense, which it joins near Demmin.

See also
List of rivers of Mecklenburg-Vorpommern

References 

Rivers of Mecklenburg-Western Pomerania
Rivers of Germany